If the surname Hull is of topographical origin, it  may derive from the Old English hyll, denoting a "dweller on or by a hill" (making it a Middle English West Country and West Midlands variant of Hill), or from a Welsh term for a rough, uneven place.  It may also be of locational origin, e.g., Kingston upon Hull on the River Hull in Yorkshire, or derive from the personal name Hulle, a pet form of Hugh. The name spread from the British Isles throughout the Anglosphere.

The first notable bearer of the name in North America, a brother of the Rev. Joseph Hull, was George Hull (1590–1659) of Crewkerne, Somerset, who in 1630 sailed on the Mary and John from Plymouth, Devon, in cooperation with the Winthrop Fleet, and helped in the Puritan founding of Dorchester, which he represented at the General Court of the Massachusetts Bay Colony. Hull later surveyed lands for the new Colony of Connecticut, including Windsor and Wethersfield; helped found Fairfield; and served as a representative to the General Court and as assistant to his good friend Roger Ludlow, who appointed him associate magistrate for towns along the shoreline.

Notable people with the surname Hull include:
 Alan Hull, English musician and songwriter
 Blair Hull, American businessman and politician
 Bobby Hull (1939–2023), Canadian ice hockey player
 Brett Hull (born 1964), Canadian–American ice hockey player; son of Bobby Hull
 Charles Henry Hull (born 1864), American economist and historian
 Chuck Hull (born 1939), American inventor of stereolithography
 Caesar Barrand Hul (1914–1940), Southern Rhodesian World War II flying ace
 Clark L. Hull (1884–1952), American psychologist
 Cordell Hull (1871–1955), U.S. Secretary of State from 1933 to 1944 under Franklin Delano Roosevelt, and the recipient of the Nobel Peace Prize in 1945
 Dennis Hull (born 1944), Canadian ice hockey player; brother of Bobby Hull
 Edith Maude Hull (1880–1947), British writer, author of the novel The Sheik
Edward Hull (1823–1906), English illustrator and watercolorist
 Edward Hull (geologist) (1829–1917), Irish geologist and stratigrapher, Director of the Geological Survey of Ireland
 Eleanor Hull (1860–1935), writer, journalist, and scholar of Old Irish
 Emmett J. Hull (1882–1957), American architect
 Everett Hull (1904–1981), American musician, inventor of the bass amplifier, and founder of Ampeg
 Francesca Hull, cast member in British TV series Made in Chelsea
 Frank Montgomery Hull (1901–1982), American entomologist
 Gertrude Hull (1866–1947), American educator
 Gordon Ferrie Hull, American physicist
 Harold Hull (1920–1988), American professional basketball player
 Henry Hull (1890–1977), American actor
 Isaac Hull, early United States Naval officer, Captain of the USS Constitution during the battle with HMS Guerriere
 James L. Hull, American Medal of Honor recipient
 Jane Dee Hull (1935–2020), American educator and politician, governor of Arizona
 John Hull (disambiguation), several people
 John Hull (1624–1683), English colonist; Treasurer and mintmaster of the Massachusetts Bay Colony
 John Hull (1761–1843), English physician, obstetrician, and botanist
 John A. Hull (1874–1944), Judge Advocate General (1924–1928) and Associate Justice of the Supreme Court of the Philippines (1932–1936)
 John A. T. Hull (1841–1928), American lawyer and politician from Iowa
 John C. Hull, Speaker of the Massachusetts House of Representatives 1925–1928 and First Securities Director 1930–1936
 John C. Hull, Professor of Derivatives and Risk Management at the University of Toronto
 John E. Hull (1895–1975), U.S. Army general
 John H. E. Hull (1923–1977), English theologian and writer on religion
 John M. Hull, Australian-born professor of religious education at the University of Birmingham
 Joseph Hull (1595–1665), English colonist and clergyman in New England
 Josephine Hull, American stage and film actress
 Katherine Hull (born 1982), Australian golfer
 Kay Hull, Australian politician
 Laurens Hull (1779–1865), American physician and politician from New York
 Lexie Hull (1999–),is an American professional basketball player for the Indiana Fever of the Women's National Basketball Association (WNBA)
 Merlin Hull, U.S. Congressman from Wisconsin
 Rae Hull, Canadian journalist
 R. F. C. Hull (1913–1974), British translator of the works of Carl Jung
 Rod Hull (1935–1999), English entertainer
 Ross Hull Canadian actor and TV personality
 Ross A. Hull Australian-American radio engineer
 Stephen A. Hull, American politician
 Thomas Hull (disambiguation), several people
 Thomas Hull (1728–1808), English actor and dramatist
 Warren Hull (1903–1974), film actor and TV personality
 William Hull (disambiguation), several people
 William Hull, American general during the American Revolutionary War and War of 1812
William Hull (1820–1880), English watercolor landscape and still-life painter, illustrator, and etcher
 William Lovell Hull (1897–1992), Canadian minister, missionary, author, and spiritual counselor to Adolf Eichmann during his imprisonment
 William Roper Hull (1856–1925), Anglo-Canadian rancher, meat packer, businessman, and philanthropist
 William Winstanley Hull (1794–1873), English liturgical writer and hymnologist
 William "Billy" Hull (b. 1912), Ulster loyalist activist and politician
 Xiea Hull, model, teacher, author and psychologist from Antigua and Barbuda

References

English-language surnames
Lists of people by surname
Surnames